The 2019 Copa del Rey Final was a football match played on 25 May 2019 that decided the winner of the 2018–19 Copa del Rey, the 117th edition of Spain's primary football cup (including two seasons where two rival editions were played). The match was played at the Estadio Benito Villamarín in Seville between Barcelona and Valencia.

Valencia won the final 2–1, achieving their 8th title overall and ending their trophy drought winning their first major trophy since 2008.

Background
Barcelona were competing in their 41st Copa del Rey final, extending the competition record, and had won a record 30 titles prior. They were the reigning champions, having defeated Sevilla 5–0 in the 2018 final. The match was their sixth consecutive final, extending the record they set in the previous season, and were seeking a fifth consecutive title, a feat never accomplished before (only Real Madrid and Athletic Bilbao have also previously won four titles consecutively).

Valencia were competing in their 17th Copa del Rey final, and would go on to win their 8th title. Their last title win had come in the 2008 final defeating Getafe 3–1.

In reaching the final, both teams were assured qualification for the four-team 2019–20 Supercopa de España.

Route to the final

Match

Details

References

2019
May 2019 sports events in Spain
Sports competitions in Seville
FC Barcelona matches
Valencia CF matches
21st century in Seville